Gabriele Hinzmann (née Trepschek; born 31 May 1947, Schwerin) is a retired track and field athlete who competed mainly in the discus throw, such as at the 1976 Summer Olympics held in Montreal, Quebec, Canada where she competed for East Germany and won the bronze medal.

Competitions
 Olympic Games
 1972 Summer Olympics – Women's discus throw
 1976 Summer Olympics – Women's discus throw

 European Athletics Championships
 1974 European Athletics Championships – Women's discus throw
 1974 European Athletics Championships – Women's discus throw

 European Cup
 1973 European Cup – Women's discus throw
 1975 European Cup – Women's discus throw

 European Junior Games
 1964 European Junior Games – Women's discus throw

See also
 East Germany at the 1976 Summer Olympics

References

External links 
 

1947 births
Living people
Sportspeople from Schwerin
East German female discus throwers
German female discus throwers
Olympic athletes of East Germany
Olympic bronze medalists for East Germany
Athletes (track and field) at the 1972 Summer Olympics
Athletes (track and field) at the 1976 Summer Olympics
Medalists at the 1976 Summer Olympics
European Athletics Championships medalists
Olympic bronze medalists in athletics (track and field)